Roderick Terrance Sawyer (born April 12, 1963) is an American politician and the current alderman of the 6th ward located in Chicago, Illinois, United States. In addition to serving as alderman, Sawyer is currently the Chairman of the Health and Human Relations Committee, a member of the Progressive Reform Caucus, and the former Chairman of the African American Caucus.

Sawyer forwent reelection to the city council in 2023 to make an unsuccessful run for mayor of Chicago in the 2023 Chicago mayoral election.

Background
Born one of three children in Chicago, Illinois to Eugene and Eleanor Sawyer (nee Taylor), Sawyer grew up in the 6th ward on the south side. Sawyer is the son of Eugene Sawyer, who served as Mayor of Chicago after the sudden death of Harold Washington from December 1987 until April 1989. His father is also noted as the second African-American to hold the position.

For high school, Sawyer attended St. Ignatius College Prep, graduating in 1981. Sawyer went on to earn a Bachelor of Science in Finance from DePaul University, and a Juris Doctor from the Chicago Kent College of Law.

Aldermanic career
Sawyer was first elected in 2011 after narrowly defeating incumbent Freddrenna Lyle, and is currently serving his third term, having been re-elected in 2015 and 2019.

In the 2019 Chicago mayoral election, Sawyer endorsed Toni Preckwinkle, giving her his endorsement in the first round of the election.

In June 2020, Sawyer proposed an ordinance which would end the Chicago Public Schools' contract to station Chicago Police Department officers at schools.

Political campaigns

2011 campaign for City Council, Ward 6

Sawyer's first run for elective office was his campaign against city council incumbent Freddrenna Lyle in Chicago's aldermanic ward 6 in 2011. Four city council incumbents, including Lyle, lost in the April 2011 elections.

2015 campaign for City Council, Ward 6

Sawyer had two opponents in the spring 2015 city council elections: Richard Wooten and Brian Garner. Sawyer received 10,659 votes in the February 2015 general election. This was 56.2% of the vote and as a result, he was declared the winner of the contest without it proceeding to a runoff.

2023 Chicago mayoral candidacy

In June 2022, Sawyer announced his candidacy for mayor in the 2023 election, challenging incumbent Mayor Lori Lightfoot.

When he announced his run for mayor, Sawyer said that crime is the first issue on his mind, and that if elected, he would fire Chicago Police Supt. David Brown.

Sawyer has been critical of incumbent mayor Lori Lightfoot on several issues. These include her late September 2022 removal of a $42.7 million property tax increase that would have taken effect prior to the 2023 election. The tax increase would have gone through on an automatic escalator basis had Lightfoot not revoked it. Sawyer said, "If you thought it was responsible to have a modest tax increase, you should stand by that. And if you feel it's not, you should stand by that. If you're not gonna do that, you're just blowing with the wind."

In the initial round of the election, Sawyer was defeated, placing last of nine candidates with less than 2,500 votes (0.43% of the election's overall vote). A week after the first round, Sawyer endorsed Paul Vallas in the runoff election.

Personal
Sawyer is married to Cheryll Aikens Sawyer. They have two children, Sydni Celeste Sawyer and Roderick T. Sawyer Jr.

Sawyer is the son of former Chicago mayor Eugene Sawyer.

Electoral history

City Council

Mayoral

External links
 Official Chicago City Council listing for Roderick Sawyer
 6ward, Roderick Sawyer's constituent services website

References

1963 births
21st-century American politicians
Chicago City Council members
Illinois Democrats
Living people
People from Chicago